The southern stargazer (Astroscopus y-graecum) is a species of marine fish in the family Uranoscopidae and genus Astroscopus. They are native to the United States.

Description 
These fish have a brownish body color with small white spots, and their pectoral fins are lined in black and white. Their tails have three black or brown stripes on the caudal. They use their pectoral fins to dig and bury themselves in the sediment. They have 8 dorsal spines, 13–14 soft dorsal rays, no anal spines, and 13 soft anal rays. They have a cleithral spine that has a venom gland. When they bury themselves in the sand they leave their eyes, nostrils, and most of their mouth above the sand. In order to breathe they take water in through the nostrils which are protected from the sand by fleshy comb-shaped fringes; the mouth also has these fringes. These fish do not have scales on the top of their heads, but have them on the rest of their bodies extending onto the fleshy part of the caudal fin. Their eyes are able to protrude slightly from the head appearing stalked, and this is to allow them to see above the sand. By using an organ located in a pouch behind their eyes they are able to create an electrical current. They are able to generate a voltage as strong as 50 volts, and this is mainly used for protection instead of a way to capture their prey. The discharge of this organ depends on the temperature of the water.

Diet 
They are predatory fish that lie in wait for smaller fish to swim near them while they are buried under the sand with their head the only thing that is not buried.

Habitat 
The southern stargazers are benthic marine fish that are reef-associated. They live most of their lives inshore.

Reproduction and life cycle 
Spawning occurs in the late spring and early summer months. They spawn on the bottom and their small transparent eggs slowly rise to the surface. When the eggs hatch the larvae are transparent that live in the water column. Once they reach this size they start to feed off of other larvae in the water column. The juveniles are likely to move inshore to sandy bay, and may stay there for many years. This is where the juveniles develop the characteristics that the adults have. The eye will move to the top of the head, on the juvenile they are on the side of the head.

Distribution 
The southern stargazer is found in the western Atlantic from North Carolina, and south along the coast to the Gulf of Mexico to the Yucatán. They can be found along the Caribbean Central and South America's coast from Mexico to Rio de Janeiro. They are not found in the West Indies.

Etymology 
Astroscopus is Latin for one who aims at the stars.

References

External links
 

Uranoscopidae
Fish described in 1829
Taxa named by Georges Cuvier